Brinley Richards (13 April 1904 – 18 September 1981) was a Welsh language poet and author, who was Archdruid of the National Eisteddfod of Wales from 1972 to 1975.

Richards was born in Cwm Llynfi, Glamorgan in South Wales, and was named after the musician and composer Henry Brinley Richards (1819–1885). He attended Maesteg Grammar School and spent a year at Cardiff University. He lived on Church Street in Maesteg, a few doors above Bethel English Baptist Chapel, and had a legal practice there for most of his later years.

At the Llanrwst Eisteddfod of 1951, he won the chair, qualifying him to become Archdruid in due course. His bardic name as Archdruid was Brinli.
 
His collected poems, Cerddi'r Dyffryn, were published in 1967.

He is buried along with his wife Muriel in St Cynwyds church in Llangynwyd.

References

1904 births
1981 deaths
Chaired bards
Welsh-language writers
20th-century Welsh writers
Welsh Eisteddfod archdruids
Welsh Eisteddfod winners
20th-century Welsh poets